Fritz Zängl (13 December 1914 – 21 May 1942) was a German skier and soldier, at last  in the rank of a Feldwebel.

Biography 
Zängl was born in Katzbach, today a borough of Cham. He was a member of the skiing club ASV Cham and served in the Gebirgsjäger-Regiment 100 in Bad Reichenhall. In the rank of an Oberjäger he participated in the German military patrol team at the FIS Nordic World Ski Championships 1939, which placed first and won the world master title.

In World War II he took part in the campaigns against France, Greece, Crete and at last against Russia, when he was killed in action near Smerdyna. He was awarded with the Eisernes Kreuz II and I.

In honor of his sports career the memorial race "Fritz-Zängl-Gedächtnislauf" is carried out by the ASV Cham since a couple of years.

References 

German military patrol (sport) runners
German Army personnel killed in World War II
1914 births
1942 deaths
People from Cham, Germany
Recipients of the Iron Cross (1939), 1st class
People from the Kingdom of Bavaria
Gebirgsjäger of World War II
Sportspeople from the Upper Palatinate
Military personnel from Bavaria